Maria Elisabetta Renzi (19 November 1786 – 14 August 1859) was an Italian Roman Catholic professed religious who established the Sisters of Our Lady of Sorrows in Rimini. She desired to become a nun as an adolescent and was prevented from joining the Order of Saint Augustine due to Napoleon Bonaparte's invasion of the Italian peninsula.

Renzi was beatified on 18 June 1989 by Pope John Paul II.

Life

Maria Elisabetta Renzi was born on 19 November 1786 in Forlì, Italy as the second of seven children of Giambattista Renzi and Vittoria Boni; one brother was Giancarlo while her sole sister was Dorotea (1793 - 1813). She was baptized on 20 November in the parish church of Saludecio.

One of her brothers said of her: "Even as a child, Elisabetta opened herself up to silence and prayer; she lived in the comforts of their birth family as a ray of light shining on pure gold; she did not acquire beauty from the wealth around her, but everything precious around her. She made herself beautiful with her great goodness and sweetness".

Her education - as was the norm at the time in her town - was placed under the direction of the Poor Clare nuns. In 1791 the parents decided to leave and move elsewhere to Mondaino. On one occasion she rode a horse but was thrown from it unscathed. Due to the fact that she should have been injured she interpreted the event as a sign of the call of God to the religious life. In 1807 she decided to enter the Order of Saint Augustine in Pietrarubbia but could not enter due to the Napoleonic suppression of religious orders in 1810. It was at this time that she had as her spiritual director the priest Vitale Corbucci.

On 29 April 1824 she departed for Coriano to work with the female group the Poor of the Crucifix while making plans for the establishment of a new religious congregation. She used the Poor of the Crucifix as an inspiration for her project. Renzi therefore drafted the Rule and the Constitution of her potential order in 1828 and presented it to the Bishop of Rimini on 12 January 1838. Renzi established her order in Coriano in 1839; the Bishop of Rimini Francesco Fentilini - on 26 August 1839 - granted approval to the order as an order of diocesan right. The order was founded on a formal level on 29 August 1839 when Renzi and ten companions made their solemn vows into her order. She then began to found communities in places such as Sogliano al Rubicone and Faenza amongst other cities. In 1846 her niece Giuseppina Renzi - a boarding student at the time - visited and became a member of her aunt's congregation.

In 1859 she was diagnosed with severe tuberculosis due to increasing stomach pains and a sore throat. Renzi died of tuberculosis on 14 August 1859 after receiving the Eucharist for the final time. When she heard the church bells she said: "I ask pardon of everyone for all my faults and omissions. Pray for me! Goodbye, beloved daughters; be generous with the Lord. I carry you all in my heart and bless you". At 8:00am she appeared to be dozing off but opened her eyes and whispered her final words: "I see ... I see ... I see ...". Pope Leo XIII approved the order in a papal decree of 25 March 1902 and approved its Constitution on the following 14 December. The order later was added as a branch of the Servite Order in 1934.

Beatification
The beatification process commenced in 1965 - under Pope Paul VI - and had been tasked with the collation of all available evidence in relation to her life and her deeds in life. The process - which granted her the posthumous title of Servant of God - closed in 1968 and received formal ratification to show it completed its work according to the criteria.

The postulation compiled the Positio - a biographical account and attesting to the pros of her cause - and submitted it to the Congregation for the Causes of Saints. But a historical commission had to approve it and deem there were no obstacles to the cause in order for it to proceed to the next stage. The commission approved it in 1986 and allowed it to continue on to the next levels.

Renzi was proclaimed to be Venerable - on 8 February 1988 - after Pope John Paul II acknowledged the fact that she had lived a model Christian life of heroic virtue - both the cardinal and theological virtues.

The miracle needed for her beatification was investigated in the place of its origin and received ratification on 10 October 1986. The pope approved it in 1989 and beatified Renzi on 18 June 1989.

The current postulator assigned to the cause is Giovanni Zubiani.

References

External links
 Hagiography Circle
 Maestre Pie dell'Addolorata
 
 Sisters of Our Lady of Sorrows on CMSWR

1786 births
1859 deaths
People from the Province of Rimini
People of the Papal States
19th-century Italian Roman Catholic religious sisters and nuns
18th-century venerated Christians
19th-century venerated Christians
Beatifications by Pope John Paul II
19th-century deaths from tuberculosis
Founders of Catholic religious communities
Italian beatified people
Venerated Catholics by Pope John Paul II
Tuberculosis deaths in Italy
Infectious disease deaths in Emilia-Romagna